Sir Roderick Sarell KCMG (23 January 1913 – 15 August 2001) was a British diplomat who was ambassador to Libya and Turkey.

Career
Roderick Francis Gisbert Sarell was educated at Radley College and Magdalen College, Oxford. He joined the Diplomatic Service in 1936 and served in Iran, Ethiopia, Iraq, Italy, Romania, Burma and Algeria before being appointed to be Ambassador to Libya 1964–69 and to Turkey 1969–73.

References
SARELL, Sir Roderick (Francis Gisbert), Who Was Who, A & C Black, 1920–2008; online edn, Oxford University Press, Dec 2012, accessed 6 April 2013
Sir Roderick Sarell (obituary),The Telegraph, London, 25 August 2001

1913 births
2001 deaths
People educated at Radley College
Alumni of Magdalen College, Oxford
Ambassadors of the United Kingdom to Libya
Ambassadors of the United Kingdom to Turkey
Knights Commander of the Order of St Michael and St George